The 14th Flying Training Wing is a wing of the United States Air Force based out of Columbus Air Force Base, Mississippi.

The 14th Operations Group and its six squadrons are responsible for the 52-week Specialized Undergraduate Pilot Training (SUPT) mission. The group also performs quality assurance for contract aircraft maintenance.

The 14th Mission Support Group provides essential services with a 5-squadron/2-division, 750+ person work force and $38 million budget. It operates/maintains facilities and infrastructure for a  pilot training base and provides contracting, law enforcement, supply, transportation, fire protection, communications, education, recreation and personnel management for 9,500 people. The group is also responsible for wartime preparedness and contingency operations.

History

Air Defense
The 14th Fighter Wing was established on 29 July 1947. It provided air defense for the northeastern United States, 1947–1949.

Vietnam War

The unit was redesignated as the 14th Air Commando Wing and was reactivated at Nha Trang Air Base Republic of Vietnam on 8 March 1966. On 1 August 1968 it was renamed the 14th Special Operations Wing and was the host unit at the base until 30 September 1971. From 15 October 1969 through 30 September 1971 the 14th SOW also operated and conducted missions from Phan Rang Air Base, Republic of Vietnam.

Operations included close and direct air support, interdiction, combat airlift, aerial resupply, visual and photographic reconnaissance, unconventional warfare, counterinsurgency operations, psychological warfare (including leaflet dropping and aerial broadcasting), forward air control operations and escort, search and rescue, escort for convoy and defoliation operations, flare drops, civic actions, and humanitarian actions.

The 14th Air Commando Wing distinguished itself by extraordinary heroism, exceptional gallantry and outstanding performance of duty in action against hostile forces in Southeast Asia from 8 March 1966 to 7 March 1967, earning a Presidential Unit Citation. Flying thousands of different sorties, elements of the Wing caused many enemy casualties and destroyed or damaged more than 8,500 structures, 500 trucks and 60 fuel sites as well as numerous automatic weapon positions, radio stations, bridges and boats.

Flying the venerable Douglas C-47 aircraft, one squadron of the Wing helped abort a large number of night hostile operations against friendly forts and hamlets through flare drops and minigun saturation fire. Despite the often heavy and accurate enemy antiaircraft fire, the search and rescue missions of the Wing recovered 91 skilled airmen during this period. In addition, the Wing's psychological warfare missions directly or indirectly influenced the surrender of thousands of enemy soldiers.

The wing also provided maintenance support for a number of tenants. The wing trained Republic of Vietnam Air Force (RVNAF) personnel in AC-119 operations and maintenance, February–August 1971, and transferred some of its AC-119s to the RVNAF, August–September 1971 as part of a phase-down for inactivation.

Flying training at Columbus
The 14th replaced, and absorbed resources of, the 3650th Pilot Training Wing in June 1972 at Columbus Air Force Base, Mississippi, and assumed an undergraduate pilot training program, plus base operations and maintenance.

Units
The 14th Flying Training Wing is currently made up of:
 14th Operations Group (14 OG)
 37th Flying Training Squadron (37 FTS)
 41st Flying Training Squadron (41 FTS)
 48th Flying Training Squadron (48 FTS)
 49th Fighter Training Squadron (49 FTS)
 50th Flying Training Squadron (50 FTS)
 81st Fighter Squadron (81 FS) (Moody Air Force Base, Georgia)
 14th Operations Support Squadron (14 OSS)
 14th Student Squadron (14 STUS)

 14th Mission Support Group (14 MSG)
 14th Civil Engineering Squadron (14 CES)
 14th Communications Squadron (14 CS)
 14th Contracting Squadron (14 CONS)
 14th Force Support Squadron (14 FSS)
 14th Logistics Readiness Squadron (14 LRS)
 14th Security Forces Squadron (14 SFS)

 14th Medical Group (14 MDG)
 14th Operational Medical Readiness Squadron (14 OMRS)
 14th Healthcare Operations Support Squadron (14 HCOSS)

Additionally, the 14th Comptroller Squadron (14 CPTS) reports directly to the wing.

Lineage
 Established as the 14th Fighter Wing on 29 July 1947
 Organized on 15 August 1947
 Inactivated on 2 October 1949
 Redesignated 14th Air Commando Wing and activated on 28 February 1966 (not organized)
 Organized on 8 March 1966
 Redesignated 14th Special Operations Wing on 1 August 1968
 Inactivated on 30 September 1971
 Redesignated 14th Flying Training Wing on 22 March 1972
 Activated on 1 June 1972

Assignments
 First Air Force, 15 August 1947 – 2 October 1949
 Pacific Air Forces, 28 February 1966
 2d Air Division, 8 March 1966
 Seventh Air Force, 1 April 1966 – 30 September 1971
 Air Training (later, Air Education and Training) Command, 1 June 1972
 Nineteenth Air Force, 1 July 1993 – present

Components
Group
 14th Fighter (later, 14th Operations): 15 August 1947 – 2 October 1949; 15 December 1991 – present

Squadrons
 1st Air Commando: 8 March 1966 – 20 December 1967
 3d Air Commando (later, 3d Special Operations): 1 May 1968 – 15 September 1969
 4th Air Commando (later, 4th Special Operations): 8 March 1966 – 15 December 1969
 5th Air Commando (later, 5th Special Operations): 8 March 1966 – 15 October 1969
 6th Air Commando: 29 February – 15 July 1968
 9th Air Commando (later, 9th Special Operations): 25 January 1967 – 30 September 1971
 14th Air Commando: 25 October 1967 – 1 May 1968
 15th Air Commando (later, 15th Special Operations): 15 March 1968 – 31 October 1970
 17th Special Operations: 1 June 1969 – 30 September 1971
 18th Special Operations: 1 October 1969 – 25 August 1971
 20th Air Commando (later, 20th Special Operations): 8 March 1966 – 1 September 1971
 37th Flying Training: 1 June 1972 – 15 December 1991
 42d Flying Training: 25 June 1990 – 15 December 1991
 43d Flying Training: 25 June 1990 – 15 December 1991
 49th Flying Training: 25 June 1990 – 15 December 1991
 50th Flying Training: 1 June 1972 – 15 December 1991
 71st Special Operations: 20 December 1968 – 10 June 1969
 90th Special Operations: 31 October 1970 – 1 September 1971
 602d Air Commando: 8 March 1966 – 8 April 1967
 604th Air Commando (later, 604th Special Operations): 15 November 1967 – 1 March 1970 (detached)
 3588th Flying Training: 1 October 1990 – 18 October 1991

Stations
 Dow Field (later Dow Air Force Base), Maine, 15 August 1947 – 2 October 1949
 Nha Trang Air Base, South Vietnam, 8 March 1966
 Phan Rang Air Base, South Vietnam, 15 October 1969 – 30 September 1971
 Columbus Air Force Base, Mississippi, 1 June 1972 – present

Aircraft

F-84 Thunderjet (1947–1949)
A-1 Skyraider (1966–1968)
AC-47 Spooky (1966–1969)
C-47 Skytrain (1966–1971)
HC-47 (1966–1969)
U-10 Super Courier (1966–1969)
CH-3 Jolly Green Giant (1966–1969)
O-2 Skymaster (1967–1971)
UH-1 Iroquois (1967–1971)
C-130E(I) Combat Talon (1968–1971)

C-123 Provider (1968–1971)
AC-130 Spectre (1968)
AC-119G Shadow /AC-119K Stinger (1968–1971)
T-41 Mescalero (1972–1973)
T-37 (1972–2008)
T-38 Talon (1972–present)
AT-38 Talon (1993–2000 and 2007–present)
T-1 Jayhawk (1996–present)
T-6 Texan II (2006–present)

References

Notes
 Explanatory notes

 Citations

Bibliography

 
 Lambert, John W. The 14th Fighter Group in World War II. Atglen, PA: Schiffer, 2008. .
 Martin, Patrick. Tail Code: The Complete History of USAF Tactical Aircraft Tail Code Markings. Schiffer Military Aviation History, 1994. .

External links
 Columbus AFB Home Page
 USAAS-USAAC-USAAF-USAF Aircraft Serial Numbers—1908 to present

Military units and formations of the United States Air Force in the Vietnam War
0014
Military units and formations established in 1972
Military units and formations in Mississippi